Edward Joseph Gorman Jr. (November 2, 1941 – October 14, 2016) was an American writer and short fiction anthologist. He published in almost every genre, but is best known for his work in the crime, mystery, western, and horror fields. His non-fiction work has been published in such publications as The New York Times and Redbook.

He has contributed to many magazines and other publications, including Xero, Black Lizard, Mystery Scene, Cemetery Dance, and the anthology Tales of Zorro.

Personal life 
Gorman was born and grew up in Cedar Rapids, Iowa, where he spent much of his adult life as well. He lived for extended periods in Des Moines, Iowa; Minneapolis, Minnesota; and Chicago, Illinois. He was married twice, first to Catherine Anne Stevens for seven years. He next married Carol Gorman (née Maxwell), an award-winning children's and young adult author. They were married thirty-four years until his death in 2016.

Writing career 
After twenty-three years in advertising, public relations, writing political speeches and producing industrial films, Gorman published his first novel Rough Cut (1984). Soon after he quit his day job and dedicated himself to writing full-time (thanks to his wife Carol's full-time teaching job).

Gorman considered himself a genre writer. In the 1970s Gorman won a short story contest sponsored by Charles Scribner & Sons. An editor there suggested he expand his winning story into a mainstream novel, but Gorman gave up after six months, saying, “I was bored out of my mind. I am a genre writer.”

Gorman's novels and stories are often set in small Midwestern towns, such as the fictional Black River Falls, Iowa (the Sam McCain series), or Cedar Rapids, Iowa (The Night Remembers). For his Dev Conrad series, Gorman drew upon his years as a political operative.

Gorman was one of the founders of Mystery Scene magazine, and served as editor and publisher until 2002. His column, “Gormania,” continues to appear regularly in its pages.

In comics, he has written for DC, Dark Horse, and most recently Short, Scary Tales, which will be publishing adaptations of his novel Cage of Night (as Cage of Night) and the short story "Stalker" (as Gut-Shot).

Kirkus Reviews has called him "One of the most original crime writers around." The Bloomsbury Review noted: "He is the poet of dark suspense." The Oxford Book of American Crime Stories said: "His novels and stories provide fresh ideas, characters and approaches." Jon Breen at Ellery Queen's Mystery Magazine once noted, "Ed Gorman has the same infallible readability as writers like Lawrence Block, Max Allan Collins, Donald E. Westlake, Ed McBain, and John D. MacDonald."

Though Gorman was long considered to be a "prolific" writer, his pace of production slowed markedly after he was diagnosed with multiple myeloma in 2002; it was incurable.

Awards 
He won a Spur Award for Best Short Fiction for his short story "The Face" in 1992. His fiction collection Cages was nominated for the 1995 Bram Stoker Award for Best Fiction Collection. His collection The Dark Fantastic was nominated for the same award in 2001. Gorman won the 1994 Anthony Award for Best Critical Work for The Fine Art Of Murder.  He was nominated for multiple Anthonys in short story categories.

He is a winner of the Life Achievement Award from the Private Eye Writers of America, and The International Horror Writers Award (previous winners include Stephen King and Richard Matheson). He was nominated for the Edgar Award.

Adaptations 
His novel The Poker Club was adapted as a film in 2008 by director Tim McCann. His short stories “The Long Silence After” and “The Ugly File” were adapted as short films. In 2016, rights to his novel Cage of Night and short story “Stalker” were bought for adaptation as graphic novels, to be published by Short, Scary Tales.

Selected bibliography

Novels and short story
Graves' Retreat (1989)
The Poker Club (1990)
What the Dead Men Say (1990)
Night Kills (1992)
Cage of Night (1992)
Wolf Moon (1993)
Batman: I, Werewolf (1993)
Shadow Games (1996)
Cast in Dark Waters (with Thomas Piccirilli) (2002)
Gun Truth (2003)
The Midnight Room (2009)
The Man From Nightshade Valley (with James Reasoner) (2012)
The Prodigal Gun (with James Reasoner) (2012)
Fast Track (with Bill Crider) (2014)
Backshot (2015)

Short Story Collections 
 “Cages” (Deadline Press, 1995)
 Famous Blue Raincoat (Crippen & Landru, 1999)
 The End of it All and Other Stories (Ramble House, 2009)
 Noir 13 (Perfect Crime Books, 2010)
 The Long Ride Back & Other Western Stories (Western Fictioneers Library, 2013)
 Scream Queen and Other Tales of Menace (Perfect Crime Books, 2014)
 A Disgrace to the Badge & Other Western Stories (2015)
 Shadow Games and Other Sinister Stories of Show Business (Short, Scary Tales, 2016)

Series
Dev Conrad Series
 Sleeping Dogs (Thomas Dunne Books, 2008)
 Stranglehold (Minotaur Books, 2010)
 Blindside (Severn House, 2012)
 Flashpoint (Severn House, 2013)
 Elimination (Severn House, 2015)

Jack Dwyer Series 
Rough Cut (1985)
New Improved Murder (1985)
Murder Straight Up (1986)
Murder in the Wings (1986)
The Autumn Dead (1987)
A Cry of Shadows (1990)
What the Dead Men Say (1990)
The Reason Why (1992)
The Dwyer Trilogy (1994) (a collection that includes The Autumn Dead, A Cry of Shadows, and the short story "Eye of the Beholder")

Tobin Series 
Murder in the Aisle (1987)
Several Deaths Later (1988)

Jack Walsh Series 
The Night Remembers (1991)

Robert Payne Series 
Blood Moon (UK title Blood Red Moon) (1994)
Hawk Moon (1995)
Harlot's Moon (1998)
Voodoo Moon (2000)

Sam McCain Series 
The Day the Music Died (1999)
Will You Still Love Me Tomorrow (2000)
Wake Up Little Susie (2001)
Save the Last Dance for Me (2002)
Everybody's Somebody's Fool (2004)
Breaking Up Is Hard To Do (2004)
Fools Rush In (2007)
Ticket to Ride (2009)
Bad Moon Rising (2011)
Riders on the Storm (Pegasus Crime, 2014)

Dean Koontz Frankenstein series 
From Dean Koontz's Frankenstein series (they are co-authored by Dean Koontz):
Book No. 2 City of Night

Pen name books

As E.J. Gorman
The Marilyn Letters
The First Lady
Daughter of Darkness
Senatorial Privilege

As Daniel Ransom
Toys in the Attic (1986)
The Forsaken (1988)
The Babysitter (1989)
Nightmare Child (1990)
The Serpent's Kiss (1992)
The Long Midnight (1992)
Night Screams (1996)
The Zone Soldiers (1996)
As Robert David Chase
 Graveyard
 Ghost Hunters
 Werewolf: A True Story of Demonic Possession

Graphic Novels 
 Kolchak: Dawn of the Demons (with Ricky Sprague) (Moonstone Books, 2016)
 Gut-Shot (based on the short story "Stalker," adapted by Ricky Sprague) (Short, Scary Tales, 2016)
 Cage of Night (based on the novel, adapted by Ricky Sprague) (Short, Scary Tales, 2016)

Anthologies
As editor and/or contributor
The Black Lizard Anthology of Crime Fiction (Black Lizard Books, 1987)
Stalkers: 19 Original Tales By the Masters of Terror (Dark Harvest Books, 1989)
Cat Crimes (1991) with Martin H. Greenberg
Prisoners and Other Stories (1992)
Dark Crimes 1 (1991)
Dark Crimes 2 (1993)
Dark Whispers (1993)
Cages (1995)
Moonchasers (1996)
Robert Bloch's Psychos (Cemetery Dance Publications, 1997) includes the short story "Out There in the Darkness"
The Big Book of Noir (1998)
Famous Blue Raincoat (1999)
October Dreams (2000)
Such a Good Girl (2001)
The Dark Fantastic (2001)
The Long Silence After (2001)
The Long Ride Back (2004)
Different Kinds of Dead (2006)
Wolf Woman Bay and 9 More of the Finest Crime and Mystery Novellas of the Year! (2007) with Martin H. Greenberg
Tales of Zorro (2008)
Kolchak the Night Stalker: Passages of the Macabre (2016)

References

External links 

Ed Gorman's blog
  under that name and points of entry to several pseudonyms

Dark Party Review Ed Gorman Discusses His Writing
Mystery Scene, magazine co-founded by Gorman with Robert J. Randisi.

1941 births
2016 deaths
Deaths from multiple myeloma
20th-century American novelists
21st-century American novelists
20th-century American short story writers
21st-century American short story writers
American horror writers
American male novelists
American male short story writers
Anthony Award winners
Coe College alumni
Macavity Award winners
Writers from Cedar Rapids, Iowa
20th-century American male writers
21st-century American male writers
Novelists from Iowa